Bruce E. Dale is a professor of Chemical Engineering at Michigan State University.  He specializes in studies of renewable energy sources, and is currently working on creating methods of turning grass into ethanol for use as fuel.

Dale received his bachelor's and master's degrees from the University of Arizona and his Ph.D. from Purdue University.

Dale is a convert to the Church of Jesus Christ of Latter-day Saints (LDS Church). He served as a missionary for the church in the Mexico West Mission.  He has been a bishop and Sunday School teacher in the LDS Church.  From 1999 to 2008 Dale served as stake president of the Lansing Michigan Stake.

Prior to joining the faculty of MSU, Dale was a professor at Colorado State University and at Texas A&M University.

In July, 2009 Dale and George W. Huber co-authored the front-page article for Scientific American about the potential of organic food, specifically non-edible organic fuels.

Sources
MSU faculty bio page
article by Dale on biomass
Huffington Post article on alternative energy sources by Dale
"New Stake Presidents", Church News, November 22, 2008
intro bio about Dale
"New stake presidencies", Church News, October 17, 1999

American chemical engineers
Colorado State University faculty
Converts to Mormonism
Michigan State University faculty
Purdue University College of Engineering alumni
Texas A&M University faculty
University of Arizona alumni
American Mormon missionaries in Mexico
Living people
American leaders of the Church of Jesus Christ of Latter-day Saints
Place of birth missing (living people)
Latter Day Saints from Arizona
Latter Day Saints from Indiana
Latter Day Saints from Michigan
Latter Day Saints from Colorado
Latter Day Saints from Texas
Year of birth missing (living people)